Chris Wood (born 24 January 1987) is an English professional footballer who plays for Worksop Town in the Northern Premier League. He can play either as a central defender or defensive midfielder.

Career

Mansfield Town

Born in Worksop, Wood came up through the Mansfield Town youth team where he was captain, before making his first-team debut aged 17 in an FA Cup tie against Colchester United in November 2004. He made his league debut in May 2005, when he came on as a substitute against Rochdale. In late March 2007, Wood was loaned to Ilkeston Town of the Northern Premier League to get first-team experience but was recalled in April to cover for injuries. After Mansfield Town were relegated to the Football Conference at the end of the 2007–08 season, he was out of contract but was offered new terms by the club.

Boston United

On 1 July 2009, Wood headed south and signed for Boston United. After being a regular in defence, he was released in May 2010 when the club achieved promotion to the Conference North. He made 47 appearances for the Pilgrims but failed to score a goal.

Worksop Town

In the summer of 2010, he joined his home town club Worksop Town on a free transfer. He made his debut in the away win at Nantwich Town and has been a key member of the first team ever since, regularly playing in the left back position.

Honours

Club

Boston United

 Unibond Northern Premier League Premier Division Play-Off Champions: 2009–2010
 Unibond League Challenge Cup Champions, 2009–2010
 Lincolnshire FA County Senior Shield Winners, 2009–2010

References

External links

1987 births
English footballers
Living people
English Football League players
Footballers from Worksop
Mansfield Town F.C. players
Ilkeston Town F.C. (1945) players
Boston United F.C. players
Northern Premier League players
Worksop Town F.C. players
Association football defenders